The American Dream Died is the eleventh full-length album by New York City hardcore punk band Agnostic Front. It was released on April 4, 2015 on Nuclear Blast. It was the first album to feature guitarist Craig Silverman.

Track list

Personnel

 Agnostic Front
 Roger Miret – vocals
 Vinnie Stigma – guitar
 Craig Silverman – guitar
 Mike Gallo – bass
 Pokey Mo – drums

Production
 Freddy Cricien – production
 Byron Filson – recording
 Paul Miner – recording, mastering, mixing
 Todd Huber – artwork, layout, photography

References

2015 albums
Agnostic Front albums
Nuclear Blast albums